Talovka is a rural locality (a selo) and the administrative center of Talovsky Selsoviet, Tarumovsky District, Republic of Dagestan, Russia. The population was 1,510 as of 2010. There are 7 streets.

Geography 
Talovka is located 21 km north of Tarumovka (the district's administrative centre) by road. Razdolye is the nearest rural locality.

References 

Rural localities in Tarumovsky District